This is a list of wars involving Taiwan.

Taiwan has been ruled by various regimes throughout its history. Since 1945, the Republic of China[Taiwanese government] controls the island.

Wars involving Taiwan

See also
 List of wars involving the Republic of China

References

 
Taiwan
Wars involving Taiwan